Aquasphaeria is a genus of fungi in the family Clypeosphaeriaceae. This is a monotypic genus, containing the single species Aquasphaeria dimorphospora.

References

External links
Index Fungorum

Xylariales
Monotypic Ascomycota genera